Acliceratia beddomei is a species of very small somewhat amphibious land snail with a gill and an operculum, a semi-terrestrial gastropod mollusk or micromollusk in the family Iravadiidae.

This species was named by Philippe Dautzenberg after his colleague M.Beddome.

Description
The elongated, turreted shell has a uniform white color. The spire is composed of eight whorls, separated by a 
closely channeled suture. The protoconch is embryonic, smooth and convex. The two following whorls are also convex, but decorated with striae slightly decurrent. The others are less convex adorned with more pronounced decurrent striae. They show, below the suture, a quite acute  projecting keel, that extends around the base of the body whorl. The aperture is oval, angular at the top. The columella is arcuate, surrounded by a callous bead, acuminate at the base.

Distribution
The type specimen was retrieved in the Atlantic Ocean off Conakry, Guinea. It also occurs off Angola and Cape Esterias.

References

 Dautzenberg, Ph.; Fischer, H. (1912). Mollusques provenant des campagnes de l'Hirondelle et de la Princesse-Alice dans les Mers du Nord. Résultats des Campagnes Scientifiques Accomplies sur son Yacht par Albert Ier Prince Souverain de Monaco, XXXVII. Imprimerie de Monaco: Monaco. 629, plates I-XI pp.
 Bernard, P.A. (Ed.) (1984). Coquillages du Gabon [Shells of Gabon]. Pierre A. Bernard: Libreville, Gabon. 140, 75 plates
 Ponder W. F. (1984) A review of the genera of the Iravadiidae (Gastropoda: Rissoacea) with an assessment of the relationships of the family. Malacologia 25(1): 21-71

Iravadiidae
Gastropods described in 1912